Pearce Hanley (born 1988 in England) is a former Australian rules footballer who played for the Gold Coast Football Club in the Australian Football League (AFL). He previously played with the Brisbane Lions from 2008 to 2016. A former Gaelic footballer, he played for the Mayo county team and is from Ballaghaderreen, where he played his club football.

Early life
Hanley was born in England to an Irish father and a Welsh mother. He and his family moved to Ballaghaderreen in County Roscommon at a young age. He is one of six siblings in his immediate family.

Gaelic football
Pearce made his senior debut in 2007 against Cavan. Hanley had previously won the Ron Barassi Medal for the best player of the International Rules Series for the Irish U-17 international rules team against Australia in 2005. It was there that he was first scouted by recruiters from Australia and he was targeted for recruitment by the Brisbane Lions as being a potential AFL player.

Australian rules football

In 2007, Pearce was signed by the Brisbane Lions, and put on the rookie list with a view of converting him to Australian rules football. At the Lions, he was mentored by fellow Irishman Colm Begley who had previously played with the club for a season. Hanley made rapid progress and his adaptation to Australian football was almost as rapid as Begley's. He impressed in an early intra-club hit-out and was a solid performer for the Suncoast Lions.

Called up by coach Leigh Matthews, he made his debut in the final Lions home match in 2008 against the Carlton Football Club in front of a crowd of 35,000 at the Brisbane Cricket Ground, replacing Begley in the side. At the end of the 2009 season, Hanley was elevated to the Lions' senior list.

Hanley went on to become an integral part of the Lions' side as a highly damaging rebound defender. In round 18, 2014 in QClash8 Hanley amassed a whopping 44 touches and won the Marcus Ashcroft Medal.

At the conclusion of the 2016 season, Hanley was traded to the Gold Coast Football Club.

In September 2020, Hanley announced his retirement from AFL, effective immediately.

Statistics
 Statistics are correct to the end of the 2016 season

|- style="background-color: #EAEAEA"
! scope="row" style="text-align:center" | 2008
|
| 42 || 2 || 0 || 0 || 17 || 10 || 27 || 9 || 6 || 0.0 || 0.0 || 8.5 || 5 || 13.5 || 4.5 || 3.0
|-
! scope="row" style="text-align:center" | 2009
|
| 42 || 1 || 0 || 0 || 3 || 7 || 10 || 1 || 0 || 0.0 || 0.0 || 3.0 || 7.0 || 10.0 || 1.0 || 0.0
|- style="background-color: #EAEAEA"
! scope="row" style="text-align:center" | 2010
|
| 42 || 9 || 3 || 0 || 78 || 61 || 139 || 32 || 26 || 0.3 || 0.0 || 8.7 || 6.8 || 15.4 || 3.6 || 2.9
|-
! scope="row" style="text-align:center" | 2011
|
| 11 || 22 || 3 || 5 || 299 || 150 || 449 || 130 || 54 || 0.1 || 0.2 || 13.6 || 6.8 || 20.4 || 5.9 || 2.5
|- style="background-color: #EAEAEA"
! scope="row" style="text-align:center" | 2012
|
| 11 || 22 || 7 || 3 || 314 || 147 || 461 || 119 || 53 || 0.3 || 0.1 || 14.3 || 6.7 || 21.0 || 5.4 || 2.4
|-
! scope="row" style="text-align:center" | 2013
|
| 11 || 20 || 16 || 9 || 296 || 134 || 430 || 98 || 50 || 0.8 || 0.5 || 14.8 || 6.7 || 21.5 || 4.9 || 2.5
|- style="background:#eaeaea;"
! scope="row" style="text-align:center" | 2014
|
| 11 || 20 || 6 || 13 || 310 || 194 || 504 || 96 || 81 || 0.3 || 0.7 || 15.5 || 9.7 || 25.2 || 4.8 || 4.1
|-
! scope="row" style="text-align:center" | 2015
|
| 11 || 11 || 9 || 9 || 151 || 88 || 239 || 58 || 33 || 0.8 || 0.8 || 13.7 || 8.0 || 21.7 || 5.3 || 3.0
|- style="background:#eaeaea;"
! scope="row" style="text-align:center" | 2016
|
| 11 || 22 || 14 || 17 || 269 || 197 || 466 || 91 || 83 || 0.6 || 0.8 || 12.2 || 9.0 || 21.2 || 4.1 || 3.8
|- class="sortbottom"
! colspan=3| Career
! 129
! 58
! 56
! 1737
! 988
! 2725
! 634
! 386
! 0.4
! 0.4
! 13.5
! 7.7
! 21.1
! 4.9
! 3.0
|}

See also
 Irish experiment
 List of players who have converted from one football code to another

References

External links

 

1988 births
Living people
VFL/AFL players born in England
Ballaghaderreen Gaelic footballers
English Gaelic footballers
Gaelic footballers who switched code
Irish emigrants to Australia
Irish expatriate sportspeople in Australia
Irish players of Australian rules football
Mayo inter-county Gaelic footballers
Queensland Australian Football League players
Brisbane Lions players
Gold Coast Football Club players
Irish people of Welsh descent
Sportspeople from County Roscommon